The Tokwane River is a river in southeastern Zimbabwe. It is a tributary of the Tokwe River.

Rivers of Zimbabwe
Save River (Africa)